This is a list of 130 species in Macroteleia, a genus of parasitoid wasps in the family Platygastridae.

Macroteleia species

 Macroteleia absona Muesebeck, 1977 i c g
 Macroteleia acuta Kozlov & Kononova, 1987 i c g
 Macroteleia aethiops Nixon, 1931 i c g
 Macroteleia africana (Risbec, 1957) i c
 Macroteleia amoena Muesebeck, 1977 i c g
 Macroteleia angelovi Petrov, 1994 i c g
 Macroteleia antennalis Kieffer, 1917 i c g
 Macroteleia arcticosa Galloway, 1978 i c g
 Macroteleia atrata Kozlov & Kononova, 1987 i c g
 Macroteleia aurea Kozlov & Kononova, 1987 i c g
 Macroteleia banksi Muesebeck, 1977 i c g
 Macroteleia bicolora Kieffer, 1908 i c g
 Macroteleia boriviliensis Saraswat, 1982 i c g
 Macroteleia brevigaster Masner, 1976 i c g
 Macroteleia bryani Fullaway, 1939 i c g
 Macroteleia carinata Ashmead, 1894 i c g b
 Macroteleia cavifrons Kieffer, 1914 i c g
 Macroteleia cebes Kozlov & Lê, 2000 i c g
 Macroteleia chandelii Sharma, 1980 i c g
 Macroteleia cleonymoides Westwood, 1835 i c g
 Macroteleia compar Muesebeck, 1977 i c g
 Macroteleia concinna Muesebeck, 1977 i c g
 Macroteleia coracina Muesebeck, 1977 i c g
 Macroteleia cornuta Dodd, 1913 i c g
 Macroteleia crates Kozlov & Lê, 2000 i c g
 Macroteleia crawfordi Kieffer g
 Macroteleia decaryi Risbec, 1950 i c g
 Macroteleia demades Kozlov & Lê, 2000 i c g
 Macroteleia densa Muesebeck, 1977 i c g
 Macroteleia diegoi Risbec, 1956 i c g
 Macroteleia discors Muesebeck, 1977 i c g
 Macroteleia dolichopa Sharma, 1980 i c g
 Macroteleia donaldsoni Galloway, 1978 i c g
 Macroteleia dones Kozlov & Lê, 2000 i c g
 Macroteleia dores Kozlov & Lê, 2000 i c g
 Macroteleia elissa Kozlov & Kononova, 1987 i c g
 Macroteleia elongata (Ashmead, 1887) i c
 Macroteleia emarginata Dodd, 1920 i c g
 Macroteleia eremicola Priesner, 1951 i c g
 Macroteleia erythrogaster Ashmead, 1894 i c g
 Macroteleia ethiopica Risbec, 1950 i c g
 Macroteleia exilis Muesebeck, 1977 i c g
 Macroteleia eximia Muesebeck, 1977 i c g
 Macroteleia famelica (Say, 1836) i c g
 Macroteleia flaviceps Kieffer, 1914 i c g
 Macroteleia flavigena Kieffer, 1910 i c g
 Macroteleia floridana (Ashmead, 1887) i c
 Macroteleia foveolata Muesebeck, 1977 i c g
 Macroteleia fugacious Kozlov & Lê, 2000 i c g
 Macroteleia goldsmithi Girault, 1920 i c g
 Macroteleia gracilicornis Dodd, 1920 i c g
 Macroteleia graeffei Kieffer, 1908 i c g
 Macroteleia grandis Muesebeck, 1977 i c g
 Macroteleia herbigrada Brues, 1915 i c g
 Macroteleia hungarica Szabó, 1966 i c g
 Macroteleia indica Sharma, 1978 i c g
 Macroteleia inermis Fouts, 1930 i c g
 Macroteleia insignis Muesebeck, 1977 i c g
 Macroteleia insolita Muesebeck, 1977 i c g
 Macroteleia insularis (Risbec, 1957) i c g
 Macroteleia laevifrons Kozlov, 1971 i c g
 Macroteleia lamba Saraswat, 1978 i c g
 Macroteleia lambertoni Kieffer, 1917 i c g
 Macroteleia larga Muesebeck, 1977 i c g
 Macroteleia liebeli Kieffer, 1917 i c g
 Macroteleia ligula Muesebeck, 1977 i c g
 Macroteleia linearis Muesebeck, 1977 i c g
 Macroteleia livingstoni Saraswat, 1982 i c g
 Macroteleia longissima Risbec, 1950 i c g
 Macroteleia macrogaster Ashmead, 1893 i c g
 Macroteleia magna Dodd, 1913 i c g
 Macroteleia mahensis Kieffer, 1910 i c g
 Macroteleia manilensis Ashmead, 1905 i c g
 Macroteleia minor Kozlov & Kononova, 1987 i c g
 Macroteleia mira Muesebeck, 1977 i c g
 Macroteleia mongolica Szabó, 1973 i c g
 Macroteleia munda Muesebeck, 1977 i c g
 Macroteleia nebrija Nixon, 1931 i c g
 Macroteleia neomexicana Muesebeck, 1977 i c g
 Macroteleia nigra Risbec, 1950 i c g
 Macroteleia nitida Kieffer, 1908 i c g
 Macroteleia nixoni Masner, 1965 i c g
 Macroteleia occipitalis Muesebeck, 1977 i c g
 Macroteleia orithyla Nixon, 1931 i c g
 Macroteleia pannonica Szabó, 1966 i c g
 Macroteleia paraensis Kieffer, 1910 i c g
 Macroteleia parilis Muesebeck, 1977 i c g
 Macroteleia peliades Kozlov & Lê, 2000 i c g
 Macroteleia philippinensis Kieffer, 1913 i c g
 Macroteleia pilosa Muesebeck, 1977 i c g
 Macroteleia platensis Brèthes, 1916 i c g
 Macroteleia pulchritinis Kononova, 1992 i c g
 Macroteleia punctatifrons Kieffer, 1917 i c g
 Macroteleia punctativentris Kieffer, 1908 i c g
 Macroteleia punctifrons Kozlov, 1971 i c g
 Macroteleia punctulata Kieffer, 1909 i c g
 Macroteleia pustacola Szabó, 1966 i c g
 †Macroteleia renatae Szabó & Oehlke, 1986 i c g f
 Macroteleia rima Muesebeck, 1977 i c g
 Macroteleia rossi Muesebeck, 1977 i c g
 Macroteleia rubra (Risbec, 1950) i c g
 Macroteleia rufa Szelényi, 1938 i c g
 Macroteleia rufithorax Muesebeck, 1977 i c g
 Macroteleia rufiventris (Szabó, 1957) i c g
 Macroteleia rugosa (Provancher, 1881) i c g
 Macroteleia rutila Muesebeck, 1977 i c g
 Macroteleia sanctivincenti Ashmead, 1894 i c g
 Macroteleia secreta Muesebeck, 1977 i c g
 Macroteleia simulans Muesebeck, 1977 i c g
 Macroteleia spartinae Muesebeck, 1977 i c g
 Macroteleia stabilis Nixon, 1931 i c g
 Macroteleia striativentris Crawford, 1910 i c g
 Macroteleia subtilis Muesebeck, 1977 i c g
 Macroteleia superans Kieffer, 1914 i c g
 Macroteleia surfacei Brues, 1907 i c g
 Macroteleia terminalis Fouts, 1930 i c g
 Macroteleia testaceinerva Cameron, 1904 i c g
 Macroteleia testaceipes Kieffer, 1908 i c g
 Macroteleia torresia Dodd, 1913 i c g
 Macroteleia townsendi Muesebeck, 1977 i c g
 Macroteleia triangularis Muesebeck, 1977 i c g
 Macroteleia tuberata Kononova & Petrov, 2003 i c g
 Macroteleia tutuilana Fullaway, 1939 i c g
 Macroteleia unica Muesebeck, 1977 i c g
 Macroteleia upoluensis Fullaway, 1939 i c g
 Macroteleia variegata Kozlov & Kononova, 1987 i c g
 Macroteleia versicolor Kieffer, 1910 i c g
 Macroteleia veterna Cockerell, 1921 i c g
 Macroteleia virginiensis Ashmead, 1893 i c g
 Macroteleia viticola Kononova & Petrov, 2003 i c g
 †Macroteleia yaguarum Perrichot & Engel 2014 f

Data sources: i = ITIS, c = Catalogue of Life, g = GBIF, b = Bugguide.net, f = Fossilworks.org

References 

Macroteleia
Articles created by Qbugbot